Darlington, also known as Pipkins Mills, is an unincorporated community in St. Helena Parish, Louisiana, United States.

Historic log structures
In 1981 the National Register of Historic Places completed a survey of St. Helena Parish and discovered seven log cabins and nineteen barns. After inspecting those sites it was determined that the local William Lee and Eudora Courtney Bazoon Farmstead log structures should be preserved for their historical significance.

References

Unincorporated communities in St. Helena Parish, Louisiana
Unincorporated communities in Louisiana